Banyan Elementary School may refer to:
Banyan Elementary School (Newbury Park, California)
Banyan Elementary School (Miami, Florida)
Banyan Elementary School (Sunrise, Florida)